The following Union Army and Navy units and commanders fought in the Second Battle of Fort Fisher (January 13–15, 1865) of the American Civil War. The Confederate order of battle is listed separately. Order of battle compiled from the army and navy organization during the expedition.

Abbreviations used

Military rank
 MG = Major General
 BG = Brigadier General
 Col = Colonel
 Ltc = Lieutenant Colonel
 Maj = Major
 Cpt = Captain
 Lt = 1st Lieutenant
 Bvt = Brevet
 Cdre=Commodore
 Lcdr=Lieutenant Commander
 Cmdr=Commander

Union Forces

Army

Terry's Provisional Corps
Bvt MG Alfred H. Terry
Engineering Advisor: Ltc Cyrus B. Comstock
Assistant Adjutant General: Cpt Adrian Terry

Navy
North Atlantic Blockading Squadron – Rear Admiral David D. Porter

Line Number 1
USS Brooklyn: Cpt. James Alden
USS Canonicus: Lcdr. George Belknap
USS Huron: Lcdr. Thomas O. Selfridge, Jr.
USS Kansas: Lcdr. Pendleton G. Watmough
USS Mahopac: Lcdr. Edward Potter
USS Maumee: Lcdr. Ralph Chandler
USS Mohican: Cmdr. Daniel Ammen
USS Monadnock: Cmdr. Enoch G. Parrott
USS New Ironsides: Cmdr. William Radford
USS Pawtuxet: Cmdr. James H. Spotts
USS Pequot: Lcdr. Daniel L. Braine
USS Pontoosuc: Lcdr. William G. Temple
USS Saugus: Cmdr. Edmund R. Colhoun
USS Seneca: Lcdr. Montgomery Sicard
USS Tacony: Lcdr. William T. Truxton
USS Unadilla: Lcdr. Frank M. Ramsay
USS Yantic: Lcdr. Thomas C. Harris
Line Number 2
USS Colorado: Cdre. Henry K. Thatcher
USS Juniata: Cpt. William Rogers Taylor
USS Mackinaw: Cmdr. John C. Beaumont
USS Minnesota: Cdre. Joseph Lanman
USS Powhatan: Cdre. James F. Schenck
USS Shenandoah: Cpt. Daniel B. Ridgley
USS Susquehanna: Cdre. Sylvanus William Godon
USS Ticonderoga: Cpt. Charles Steedman
USS Tuscarora: Cmdr. James M. Frailey
USS Vanderbilt: Cpt. Charles W. Pickering
USS Wabash: Cpt. Melancton Smith
Line Number 3
USS Chippewa: Lcdr. Aaron Weaver
USS Fort Jackson: Cpt. Benjamin F. Sands
USS Iosco: Cmdr. John Guest
USS Maratanza: Lcdr. George Young
USS Montgomery: Lt. Thomas C. Dunn
USS Monticello: Lcdr. William B. Cushing
USS Osceola: Cmdr. John M.B. Clitz
USS Quaker City: Cmdr. William F. Spicer
USS R. R. Cuyler: Cmdr. Charles Henry Bromedge Caldwell
USS Rhode Island: Cmdr. Stephen D. Trenchard
USS Santiago de Cuba: Cpt. Oliver S. Glisson
USS Sassacus: Lcdr. John L. Davis
Reserve Line
USS Advance: Lcdr. John H. Upshur
USS Alabama: Lt. Amos R. Langthorne
USS Aries: Lt. Francis S. Wells
USS Britannia: Lt. William B. Sheldon
USS Cherokee: Lt. William E. Dennison
USS Emma: Lt. James M. Williams
USS Eolus
USS Fort Donelson
USS Gettysburg: Lt. Roswell Lamson
USS Governor Buckingham: Lt. John MacDiarmid
USS Lilian : Lt. T.A. Harris
USS Little Ada
USS Malvern: Lt. Benjamin H. Porter
USS Nansemond
USS Tristram Shandy: Lt. Edward F. Devens
USS Wilderness
Naval Landing Party (1,600 Sailors and 400 Marines): Fleet Cpt. Kidder Breese:
 1st Division: Lcdr. Charles H. Cushman
 2nd Division: Lcdr. James Parker, Jr.
 3rd Division: Lcdr. Thomas O. Selfridge, Jr.
 4th Division (USMC): Cpt. Lucien L. Dawson

Notes

See also

 North Carolina in the American Civil War

References
 
 Moore, Mark A. The Wilmington Campaign and the Battles for Fort Fisher. Da Capo Press, 1999.
 Dyer, Frederick H., A compendium of the War of the Rebellion, Volume 1, 1908, Des Moines IA.
 U.S. Naval War Records Office, Official Records of the Union and Confederate Navies in the War of the Rebellion. Washington, DC: U.S. Government Printing Office, 1894–1922.
 U.S. War Department, The War of the Rebellion: a Compilation of the Official Records of the Union and Confederate Armies. Washington, DC: U.S. Government Printing Office, 1880–1901.

External links
North Carolina Historical Sites: Fort Fisher - ORGANIZATION OF UNION FORCES

American Civil War orders of battle